Tonghe is a town of Pingnan County, Guangxi, China. , it administers the following 14 villages:
Lianshan Village
Pingmei Village
Wuquan Village
Liangtian Village
Chenlong Village
Yuhua Village
Huobu Village
Lidao Village
Pingtang Village
Liuli Village
Guandong Village
Tongchao Village
Miaoke Village
Xinya Village

References

Towns of Guangxi
Pingnan County, Guangxi